Marcellin College is a Catholic secondary boys' college in Bulleen, Victoria, Australia.

The school was founded in 1950 by the Marist Brothers originally in Canterbury Road, Camberwell, Victoria. A senior school campus was opened in Bulleen for years 9 to 12 with the Canterbury campus catering for years 4 to 8. With the school population growing the Junior School in Camberwell stopped accepting students in grades 4, 5 and 6 and took only Years 7 and 8. The college consolidated its campuses in 1993 and the Junior School was closed.

The college is a member of the Associated Grammar Schools of Victoria and the Association of Marist Schools of Australia. It comes under the north eastern region of Catholic Education Melbourne.

Sport
Marcellin College is a member of the Associated Grammar Schools of Victoria in recent years, Marcellin's 1st football team achieved premierships in 2015, 2016 & 2017. The college was formerly a member of the Associated Catholic Colleges from 1952 to 1963.

Marcellin is one of many schools that are "renowned" for their production of AFL players in spite of the fact that the school does not issue scholarships to students who may be talented at a particular sport.

AGSV premierships 
Marcellin has won the following AGSV premierships.

 Athletics (2) – 1968, 2019
 Basketball (17) – 1990, 1991, 1992, 1997, 1998, 1999, 2004, 2011, 2012, 2013, 2014, 2015, 2016, 2017, 2019, 2020, 2021
 Cricket (9) – 1970, 1974, 1981, 1983, 1994, 2000, 2002, 2007, 2015
 Cross Country (22) – 1998, 2000, 2001, 2002, 2003, 2004, 2005, 2006, 2007, 2008, 2009, 2010, 2011, 2012, 2013, 2014, 2015, 2016, 2017, 2018, 2019, 2021
 Football (9) – 1977, 1983, 1984, 1997, 1999, 2000, 2015, 2016, 2017
 Soccer (12) – 1990, 1992, 1995, 1999, 2001, 2005, 2006, 2008, 2009, 2011, 2015, 2021
 Squash (3) – 2000, 2003, 2010
 Tennis – 1999
 Volleyball – 2015

Notable alumni

Entertainment, media and the arts 
 Stephen Curry – actor and comedian
 Kaz James – solo artist & international DJ
 Andrew Maher – media personality (The Front Bar)
 Anthony Pappa – international DJ

Politics 
 Martin Dixon – Former Liberal member of Nepean, Minister for Education 2010–2014
 Michael O'Brien – Liberal Party member of the Victorian Legislative Assembly, former Victorian opposition leader.
 Greg Mirabella – Former Liberal Party senator of the Australian Senate and current president of the Liberal Party of Australia (Victorian Division)

Sports

AFL 
 Marcus Bontempelli – AFL Western Bulldogs player
 Callum Brown – AFL Collingwood player.
 Gavin Brown – former AFL Collingwood captain & Premiership player.
 Tyler Brown – AFL Collingwood player.
 Josh Caddy – AFL Richmond Football Club player
 Anthony Carafa – former AFL Fitzroy Football Club player.
 Jason Castagna – AFL player Richmond Football Club
 Jason Cripps – former AFL St Kilda player.
 Peter Curran – former AFL Hawthorn Premiership player.
 Paul Dimattina – former AFL Western Bulldogs player & restaurateur.
 Michael Erwin – AFL Collingwood Football Club
 Dale Fleming – former AFL Fitzroy and Hawthorn player.
 Matthew Head – former AFL field umpire
 Patrick Karnezis – former AFL Brisbane Lions and Collingwood player
 Greg Madigan – former AFL Hawthorn and Fremantle player.
 Frank Marchesani – former AFL Carlton Football Club and Fitzroy Football Club player.
 Justin McInerney – AFL Sydney Swans player
 Leigh Montagna – AFL St Kilda player.
 Jack Newnes – AFL Carlton player
 Luke Shuey – AFL West Coast Eagles player.
 Brayden Sier – AFL Footballer Collingwood Football Club
 Stephen Silvagni – former AFL Carlton Football Club player, Full Back of the Century.
 Andrew Tranquilli – AFL Collingwood player.
 David Zaharakis – AFL Essendon player.

Soccer 

 Mark Bresciano – Socceroo, plays also for Al-Gharafa, holds the record for highest transfer fee for an Australian player.
 Daniel Mullen – Socceroos, Adelaide United, Melbourne Victory, Western Sydney Wanderers

Tennis 

 Pat Cash – Tennis Player (attended Marcellin College at the Camberwell Campus on Canterbury Road).
 Peter McNamara – tennis player, former world No. 7.

Cricket 

 Michael Dimattina – Cricketer

Criminals
 Alphonse Gangitano – criminal known as the "Black Prince of Lygon Street", face of the Carlton Crew, said to have started the Melbourne Gangland War with the killing of Greg Workman.

References

External links
 

Catholic secondary schools in Melbourne
Association of Marist Schools of Australia
Associated Grammar Schools of Victoria
Boys' schools in Victoria (Australia)
Educational institutions established in 1950
1950 establishments in Australia
Buildings and structures in the City of Manningham